The health effects of salt are the conditions associated with the consumption of either too much or too little salt. Salt is a mineral composed primarily of sodium chloride (NaCl) and is used in food for both preservation and flavor. Sodium ions are needed in small quantities by most living things, as are chloride ions. Salt is involved in regulating the water content (fluid balance) of the body. The sodium ion itself is used for electrical signaling in the nervous system.

The WHO further recommends that salt intake be adjusted for those aged 2 to 15 years old based on their energy requirements relative to those of adults.

As an essential nutrient, sodium is involved in numerous cellular and organ functions. Several national health organizations recommend limiting sodium consumption to 2.3 g per day. However, some studies have found that sodium intake that is below 3 g per day (equivalent to about 7.5 g of salt) may increase risk for cardiovascular disease and early death.

Acute effects

Hypernatremia (high blood sodium level, above 145 mEq/L) causes thirst, and due to brain cell shrinkage may cause confusion, muscle twitching, or spasms. With severe elevation, seizures and comas may occur.  Death can be caused by ingestion of large amounts of salt at a time (about 1 g per kg of body weight). Deaths have also been caused by use of salt solutions as emetics, typically after suspected poisoning.

Hyponatremia, or blood sodium levels below 135 mEq/L, causes brain cells to swell; the symptoms can be subtle and may include altered personality, lethargy, and confusion. In severe cases, when blood sodium falls below 115 mEq/L, stupor, muscle twitching or spasms, seizures, coma, and death can result.

Long-term effects

About 95% of the world's populations have a mean intake of salt that is between 6 g and 12 g daily. Widespread advice that salt intake be restricted below this range is not supported by evidence from randomized controlled trials nor is it supported by evidence from prospective observational studies. In fact, intake of less than 5.8 g of salt per day typically results in activation of the renin-angiotensin-aldosterone system, which leads to an increase in plasma lipids and increased mortality.

Although many health organizations and recent reviews state that high consumption of salt increases the risk of several diseases in children and adults, the effect of high salt consumption on long-term health is controversial. Some suggest that the effects of high salt consumption are insignificant.

Excess sodium consumption can increase blood pressure. Most studies suggest a "U" shaped association between salt intake and health, with increased mortality associated with both excessively low and excessively high salt intake.

Health effects associated with excessive sodium consumption include:
 Stroke and cardiovascular disease.
 High blood pressure: Evidence shows an association between salt intakes and blood pressure among different populations and age ranges in adults. Reduced salt intake also results in a small but statistically significant reduction in blood pressure.
 Left ventricular hypertrophy (cardiac enlargement): "Evidence suggests that high salt intake causes left ventricular hypertrophy. This is a strong risk factor for cardiovascular disease, independently of blood pressure effects." "...there is accumulating evidence that high salt intake predicts left ventricular hypertrophy." Excessive salt (sodium) intake, combined with an inadequate intake of water, can cause hypernatremia. It can exacerbate renal disease.
 Edema (fluid retention): A decrease in salt intake has been suggested to treat edema.
 Kidney disease: A US expert committee reported in 2013 the common recommendation by several authorities "to reduce daily sodium intake to less than 2,300 milligrams and further reduce intake to 1,500 mg among persons who are 51 years of age and older and those of any age who are African-American or have hypertension, diabetes, or chronic kidney disease", but concluded that there was no health-outcome-based rationale for reducing intake below 2,300 mg, and did not have a recommendation for an upper limit.

A meta-analysis investigated the association between sodium intake and health outcomes, including all-cause mortality and cardiovascular disease (CVD) events. Low sodium intake level was a mean of <115 mmol (2645 mg), usual sodium intake was 115-215 mmol (2645–4945 mg), and a high sodium intake was >215 mmol (4945 mg), concluding: "Both low sodium intakes and high sodium intakes are associated with increased mortality, consistent with a U-shaped association between sodium intake and health outcomes".

Salt-preserved foods

Possible effects of microplastic contamination
Microplastic contamination in sea salt has been confirmed in all areas of the world, ranging from zero to 1,674 particles per kilogram. The most common particles are polypropylene, followed by polyethylene and nylon. Microplastic particles per kg sea salt tend to be higher when sourced from Asian countries. Salt sourced from India ranged from 115 to 560 particles/kg. Sea salt sourced from China reported more than 400/kg. Microplastics also accrue in shellfish grown or harvested in regions with microplastic contamination of seawater, and are a significant contributor to human exposure. The extent to which humans are exposed to microplastics in foods and beverages can be assessed via measuring microplastics content in feces, but the health effects, if any, are poorly understood.

Dietary recommendations
Recommended intakes of salt are usually expressed in terms of sodium intake as an Adequate Intake (AI) and a Tolerable upper intake level (Upper Limit or UL). Salt (as sodium chloride) contains 39.3 percent of sodium by weight.

As of 2009 the average sodium consumption in 33 countries was in the range of 2,700 to 4,900 mg/day. This ranged across many cultures, and together with animal studies, this suggests that sodium intake is tightly controlled by feedback loops in the body. This makes recommendations to reduce sodium consumption below 2,700 mg/day potentially futile. Upon review, an expert committee that was commissioned by the Institute of Medicine and the Centers for Disease Control and Prevention reported that there was no health outcome-based rationale for reducing daily sodium intake levels below 2,300 milligrams, as had been recommended by previous dietary guidelines; the report did not have a recommendation for an upper limit of daily sodium intake.

The United States Centers for Disease Control and Prevention (CDC) states that excess sodium can increase blood pressure and the risk for heart disease and stroke in some individuals. Therefore, health authorities recommend limitations on dietary sodium. The United States Department of Health and Human Services recommends that individuals consume no more than 1500–2300 mg of sodium (3750–5750 mg of salt) per day.

Although sea salt is sometimes promoted as being healthier than table salt, both forms have the same sodium content.

Labeling
UK: The Food Standards Agency defines the level of salt in foods as follows: "High is more than 1.5 g salt per 100 g (or 0.6 g sodium). Low is 0.3 g salt or less per 100 g (or 0.1 g sodium). If the amount of salt per 100 g is in between these figures, then that is a medium level of salt." In the UK, foods produced by some supermarkets and manufacturers have 'traffic light' colors on the front of the packet: red (high), amber (medium), or green (low).

USA: The FDA Food Labeling Guide stipulates whether a food can be labeled as "free" "low," or "reduced/less" in respect of sodium. When other health claims are made about a food (e.g., low in fat, calories, etc.), a disclosure statement is required if the food exceeds 480 mg of sodium per 'serving'.

Campaigns

Australia 
In Australia, the "Drop the Salt! Campaign" aimed to reduce the consumption of salt by Australians to 6g per day over the course of five years ending in 2012.

United Kingdom 
Consensus Action on Salt and Health (CASH) established in the United Kingdom in 1996, actively campaigns to raise awareness of the alleged harmful health effects of salt. The 2008 focus includes raising awareness of high levels of salt hidden in sweet foods that are marketed towards children. In 2004, Britain's Food Standards Agency started a public health campaign called "Salt – Watch it", which recommends no more than 6 g of salt per day; it features a character called Sid the Slug and was criticised by the Salt Manufacturers Association (SMA). The Advertising Standards Authority did not uphold the SMA complaint in its adjudication. In March 2007, the FSA launched the third phase of their campaign with the slogan "Salt. Is your food full of it?" fronted by comedian Jenny Eclair.

United States

Federal programs 
Since 2010, as part of the Sodium Reduction in Communities Program (SRCP), the United States Centers for Disease Control and Prevention funded local communities across the United States to implement a variety of policy, systems, and environmental change strategies focused on increasing access to lower sodium in foods in a variety of settings such as hospitals, congregate meal sites, and university settings.

Voluntary initiatives 
In January 2010, New York City launched the National Salt Reduction Initiative (NSRI). It is the only coordinated, voluntary effort to reduce sodium in the United States, an effort supported by the Institute of Medicine as an interim goal in advance of federal action on sodium reduction.

As of 2013, over 90 state and local health authorities and health organizations have signed on as partners of the NSRI. Together, the NSRI partnership encourages food manufacturers and chain restaurants to voluntarily commit to NSRI sodium reduction targets for 2012 and 2014. The NSRI aims to reduce sodium in the food supply by 25 percent in five years and reduce population sodium intake by 20 percent in the same time, thereby reducing risk for heart attacks and strokes.

Twenty-one companies met their 2012 NSRI commitment. Notable reductions include: 15 percent reduction of sodium in Heinz ketchup; 32 percent reduction of sodium in the Subway's Subway Club sandwich; 33 percent reduction of sodium in Nabisco's Honey Teddy Grahams; 18 percent reduction of sodium in Kraft Single American Slices; and 20 percent reduction of Ragu Old World Style Traditional Tomato Sauce.

Separate from the NSRI, major food producers pledged to reduce the sodium content of their food. Pepsi developed a "designer salt" more powdery than the salt regularly used, inended to reduce sodium levels by 25 percent in its Lay's potato chips.
Nestlé's prepared foods company, which produces frozen meals, announced that it will reduce sodium in its foods by 10 percent by 2015. General Mills announced that it will reduce the sodium content of 40 percent of its foods by about 20 percent by 2015. Chain restaurants made pledges to lower sodium over time.

Taxation 
In the United States, taxation of sodium has been proposed as a method of decreasing sodium intake and thereby improving health in countries where typical salt consumption is high. Taking an alternative view, the Salt Institute, a salt industry body based in North America, is active in promoting the use of salt, and questioning or opposing the recommended restrictions on salt intake.

Dietary reduction

A low sodium diet reduces the intake of sodium by the careful selection of food. The use of a salt substitute can provide a taste offsetting the perceived blandness of low-salt food; potassium chloride is widely used for this purpose. The World Health Organization (WHO) recommends daily potassium intake of not less than 3,510 mg. Government interventions such as food product reformulation and food procurement policy have the potential to reduce the population salt intake.

Studies found that excessively low sodium intake, below about three grams (3,000 mg) of salt per day, is associated with increased mortality and higher risk for cardiovascular disease.

A 2020 Cochrane systematic review concludes that for white people with hypertension, reducing salt intake results in a decrease of about 4 mmHg (about 3.5%) of their blood pressure; for people with normal blood pressure, the decrease was negligible. Weak evidence indicated that these effects might be a little greater in black and Asian people. This review also indicates potential negative side effects on hormones and lipid levels, so that decreasing salt intake is not necessarily recommended for people with normal blood pressure.

In people with chronic kidney disease, including those on dialysis, there is high-certainty evidence that dietary salt restriction may help to lower systolic and diastolic blood pressure, as well as albuminuria. The risk of hypotensive symptoms, such as dizziness, may also increase in some people, with moderate certainty.  It is unclear whether this affects the dosage required for anti-hypertensive medications. The effect of salt restriction on extracellular fluid, oedema, and total body weight reduction is also uncertain.

References

Further reading

 
 
 

Edible salt
Salt